Karasz may refer to:

Places 
 Kárász, a village in Hungary

People 
 Anna Kárász, kayaker; see List of world records in canoeing
 Ilonka Karasz (1896-1981), industrial designer and illustrator
 Mariska Karasz (1898-1960), fashion designer and textile artist